The following elections occurred in the year 2001.

Africa
 2001 Beninese presidential election
 2001 Cape Verdean parliamentary election
 2001 Cape Verdean presidential election
 2001 Chadian presidential election
 2001 Gabonese legislative election
 2001 Gambian presidential election
 2000–2001 Ivorian parliamentary election
 2001 Malagasy presidential election
 2001 Mauritanian parliamentary election
 2001 São Tomé and Príncipe presidential election
 2001 Senegalese parliamentary election
 2001 Seychellois presidential election
 2001 Ugandan parliamentary election
 2001 Ugandan presidential election
 2001 Zambian general election

Asia
 2000–2001 Azerbaijani parliamentary election
 2001 Bangladeshi general election
 2001 East Timorese parliamentary election
 2001 Iranian presidential election
 2001 Israeli prime ministerial election
 2001 Macanese legislative election
 2001 Philippine House of Representatives elections
 2001 Republic of China legislative election
 2001 Singaporean general election
 2001 Sri Lankan parliamentary election
 2001 Thai general election

India
 2001 Tamil Nadu legislative assembly election

Japan
 2001 Japanese House of Councillors election
 2001 Tokyo prefectural election

Malaysia
 2001 Sarawak state election

Philippines
 2001 Autonomous Region in Muslim Mindanao expansion and inclusion plebiscite
 2001 Autonomous Region in Muslim Mindanao general election
 2001 Cebu City local elections
 2001 Philippine Senate election

Europe
 2001 Albanian parliamentary election
 2001 Andorran parliamentary election
 2001 Basque parliamentary election
 2001 Belarusian presidential election
 2001 Bulgarian parliamentary election
 2001 Bulgarian presidential election
 2001 Cypriot legislative election
 2001 Danish parliamentary election
 2001 Kosovan parliamentary election
 2001 Liechtenstein parliamentary election
 2001 Manx general election
 2001 Montenegrin parliamentary election
 2001 Norwegian Sami parliamentary election
 2001 Norwegian parliamentary election
 2001 Polish parliamentary election
 2001 Portuguese presidential election
 2001 Sammarinese general election

France
 2001 French cantonal elections
 2001 French municipal elections

Germany
 2001 Baden-Württemberg state election
 2001 Berlin state election
 2001 Hamburg state election
 2001 Rhineland-Palatinate state election

Italy
 Italian Senate election in Lombardy, 2001
 2001 Italian general election
 Italian general election, 2001 (Sardinia)
 Italian general election, 2001 (Veneto)
 2001 Molise regional election
 2001 Sicilian regional election

Moldova
 2001 Moldovan parliamentary election
 2001 Moldovan presidential election
 2001 Transnistrian presidential election

Spain
 2001 Galician parliamentary election

United Kingdom
 2001 United Kingdom general election results in Scotland
 2001 Banff and Buchan by-election
 2001 Conservative Party leadership election
 2001 United Kingdom general election result in Cornwall
 2001 Ipswich by-election
 List of MPs elected in the 2001 United Kingdom general election
 2001 United Kingdom local elections
 2001 Strathkelvin and Bearsden by-election
 2001 United Kingdom general election

United Kingdom local
 2001 United Kingdom local elections
 2001 Northern Ireland local elections

English local
 2001 Buckinghamshire County Council election
 2001 Halton Council election
 2001 Kent Council election
 2001 Lancashire County Council election
 2001 Shropshire County Council election
 2001 Southend-on-Sea Council election
 2001 Suffolk County Council election
 2001 Thurrock Council election
 2001 Wiltshire Council election
 2001 Wokingham Council election

North America
 2001 Honduran general election
 2001 Nicaraguan general election

Canada
 2001 Alberta general election
 2001 British Columbia general election
 2001 Green Party of Ontario leadership election
 2001 Quebec municipal elections

Alberta municipal
 2001 Calgary municipal election
 2001 Edmonton municipal election

Caribbean
 2001 Montserratian general election
 2001 Saint Lucian general election
 2001 Tobago House of Assembly election
 2001 Trinidad and Tobago general election

United States
 2001 United States elections

United States House of Representatives 
 2001 Massachusetts's 9th congressional district special election
 2001 South Carolina's 2nd congressional district special election
 2001 Massachusetts's 9th congressional district special election

United States gubernatorial
 2001 United States gubernatorial elections
 2001 New Jersey gubernatorial election
 2001 Virginia gubernatorial election
 2001 Pennsylvania state elections

United States mayoral
 2001 Charlotte mayoral election
 2001 Houston mayoral election
 2001 Jersey City mayoral election
 2001 Los Angeles mayoral election
 2001 New York City mayoral election
 2001 Pittsburgh mayoral election
 2001 Raleigh mayoral election

Oceania
 2001 Fijian general election
 2001 Samoan general election
 2001 Solomon Islands general election

Australia
 2001 Aston by-election
 2001 Auburn state by-election
 2001 Australian Capital Territory general election
 2001 Australian federal election
 2001 Campbelltown state by-election
 2001 Northern Territory general election
 2001 Queensland state election
 2001 Ryan by-election
 2001 Surfers Paradise state by-election
 2001 Tamworth state by-election
 2001 Western Australian state election

New Zealand
 2001 Wellington City mayoral election

South America
 2001 Argentine legislative election
 2001 Chilean parliamentary election
 2001 Falkland Islands general election
 2001 Falkland Islands electoral system referendum
 2001 Guyanese legislative election

See also

 
2001
Elections